On 28 June 2018, a large fire destroyed 15 homes and several stalls at the Gikomba Market in Nairobi, Kenya. The fire burned from 2:30 a.m. to 4:30 a.m., killing 15 people.

See also
Gikomba bombings

References

2018 in Kenya
2018 fires in Africa
2010s in Nairobi
Fires in Kenya
June 2018 events in Africa
2018 disasters in Kenya